Danville Schools is a school district located in Danville, Kentucky. It comprises a primary school, intermediate school, one middle school, and one high school and provides educational programs for about 1850 students.

The district employs around 350 professional and support staff, of which over 130 are teaching staff. It operates with a budget over $20,000,000. Taxes and other local revenues account for approximately 70% of the budget.

Schools

High school
Danville High School (9-12) 550 students

Middle school
John W. Bate Middle School (6-8) 430 students

Elementary schools
Mary G. Hogsett Primary (Pre K-1) 300 students
Edna L. Toliver Intermediate (2-5) 600 students

Elementary Consolidation

The school district formerly had three elementary schools, however at the start of the 2018/19 school year a primary school, and an intermediate school opened. Talks of this had been going on since the 1990s, however the plans had fallen through. During a board meeting in the 2013/14 school year, the plans were restored, as the board decided to consolidate their elementary schools into a primary and intermediate school. They picked Edna L. Toliver Elementary School to host the intermediate grades because it was the biggest elementary school. Construction to add on and renovate the school began in the spring of 2016 and was completed in the summer of 2018. Jennie Rogers Elementary and Mary G. Hogsett Elementary remained as candidates to host the primary school. This sparked a debate about which school would be a better host for the primary school. After much consideration in the fall of 2017, Mary G. Hogsett was selected to host the primary school. This meant that the Board of Education would move into the Jennie Rodgers building. Jennie Rogers Elementary School closed in May 2018, after being open for 53 years. However Hogsett needed renovations to suit primary students. The renovations would last a little over a year, so the Jennie Rodgers building served as Mary G. Hogsett Primary School for the 2018/19 school year. Originally, Jennie Rodgers was to be Danville School's new central office, but over the 2018/19 school year, the school district bought the American National University campus building, right beside Danville High School. Over the summer of 2019, this building was renovated as the district's new central office. The Jennie Rogers building is currently used for storage. Later that summer, Mary G. Hogsett reopened as the primary school.

Board of Education
The Board of Education has five at-large members. The current members of the Board of Education are:
Esther Rugerio
Glenn Ball-Vice Chairman
Jennifer Pustateri
Wade Stanfield
Steve Becker Chairman 
The Superintendent also attends the meetings. Currently Dr. Elmer Thomas is Interim Superintendent, since taking over for Dr. Tammy McDonald in October of 2021.

References

External links

Danville, Kentucky
School districts in Kentucky
Education in Boyle County, Kentucky